This list is about Djurgårdens IF players with at least 100 league appearances. For a list of all Djurgårdens IF players with a Wikipedia article, see :Category:Djurgårdens IF Fotboll players. For the current Djurgårdens IF first-team squad, see First-team squad.

This is a list of Djurgårdens IF players with at least 100 league appearances. Sven Lindman is the player with most Allsvenskan appearances, 312 matches and the most Allsvenskan goals has Gösta Sandberg, with 70.Gösta Sandberg is the player with the most league appearances, 322 matches. Gösta Sandberg has scored the most league goals, 77 goals.

Players
Matches of current players as of before 2023 season.

References

Players
Djurgardens IF Fotboll
Association football player non-biographical articles